Ponticoccus lacteus  is a Gram-negative, aerobic, rod-shaped and non-motile bacterium from the genus Ponticoccus which has been isolated from surface seawater from the South China Sea.

References 

Rhodobacteraceae
Bacteria described in 2015